This is a list of wars involving the Republic of Colombia and its predecessor states from 1810 to the present day.

References

 
Colombia
Colombia history-related lists
Military history of Colombia